Jebel Buhais or Jebel Al-Buhais is a geological feature, an extensive rocky outcrop, as well as a Rayyan site located near Madam in the central region of the Emirate of Sharjah, the UAE, about  southeast of the city of Sharjah. The area contains an extensive necropolis, consisting of burial sites spanning the Stone, Bronze, Iron and Hellenistic ages of human settlement in the UAE. Burials at Jebel Buhais (Jebel is Arabic for mountain) date back to the 5th Millennium BCE.

Jebel Buhais is the oldest radiometrically dated inland burial site in the UAE. The area is protected, having been defined as a nature reserve.

History and prehistory

Discovery 
The site was first appreciated as being of potential significance by archaeologists from Iraq in 1973, but extensive excavations did not take place until the late 1980s, with digs undertaken by the French mission to the Emirate of Sharjah and from the Autonomous University of Madrid through to the early 1990s. Following this early work, researchers from the Sharjah government's Directorate of Antiquities discovered a camel entombed in a grave site, BHS 12, which led to a team from the University of Tübingen carrying out digs from 1995 onwards. The discovery and excavation of BHS 12 led to the discovery of the important BHS 18 site, which saw 10 digs from 1996-2005 uncovering a burial site which was to become 'one of the key neolithic sites in Southern Arabia'. The complete remains of some 600 individuals have been found at the site, with many thought yet to be found. Of the many tombs and sites at Jebel Buhais, the clover-shaped Wadi Suq period tomb BHS 66 stands as a unique piece of funerary architecture in the UAE.

Stone Age 
Dated to the late Stone Age, Neolithic finds at BHS 18 have been carbon-dated spanning some 1,000 years from 5,000 to 4,000 BCE, with burials at the site thought to be those of nomadic herders who travelled inland for the winter season. Jebel Buhais is unique as an inland neolithic site in the UAE, all other sites discovered to date have been coastal, and the site has yielded no evidence of burials in the following millennium. This is thought to be consistent with changing patterns of human life as a result of climate change: a spring discovered at Jebel Buhais dried up at this stage, an event contemporaneous with similar discoveries pointing to increased aridity in the interior of Oman. Throughout Southern Arabia, evidence of human inland settlement in the 3rd millennium BCE is scant.

Post-Neolithic era 
Subsequent burials at Jebel Buhais represent the early Bronze Age Hafit period (3200 - 2600 BCE), with many distinctive 'beehive' Hafit graves discovered. None, however, were found with human remains of that era. The subsequent era of human occupation, Umm Al Nar (2600-2000 BCE) is not represented at Jebel Buhais although there were Umm Al Nar period burials in nearby Mleiha. Iron Age burials, particularly the group of graves defined as BHS 85, are thought to be linked to the nearby Iron Age settlement site of Al Thuqeibah.

Wadi Suq graves at Jebel Buhais include those found at BHS 8. A number of later burials, including some invasive later burials in older grave sites, are also evident at the site.

Geological park 
On Monday the 21st of January, 2020, Sheikh Sultan bin Muhammad Al-Qasimi, Ruler of Sharjah, inaugurated the Buhais Geology Park. The park is meant to showcase to visitors the archaeological importance of Jebel Buhais and surrounding areas in the Emirate, using the fossils and geological features contained there, which date back at least 93 million years to the Cretaceous era.

See also 
 List of Ancient Settlements in the UAE
 Archaeology of the United Arab Emirates

References 

Al-Madam, Sharjah
Archaeological sites in the Emirate of Sharjah
Burial monuments and structures in the United Arab Emirates
Geography of the Emirate of Sharjah
Hills of the United Arab Emirates
History of the United Arab Emirates